"I Guess I'm in Love" (stylised in all capitals) is a song by Australian singer Clinton Kane, released on 20 August 2021 as the second single from his debut album, Maybe Someday It'll All Be OK.

At the 2022 ARIA Music Awards, the song was nominated for ARIA Award for Song of the Year.

Charts

Weekly charts

Year-end charts

Certifications

References

2021 songs
2021 singles
Clinton Kane songs
Columbia Records singles
Songs written by Clinton Kane
Sony Music singles